Shortly is an unincorporated community in Sussex County, Delaware, United States. Shortly is located on Delaware Route 20, west of Millsboro.

References

Unincorporated communities in Sussex County, Delaware
Unincorporated communities in Delaware